The Brazilian Roller Hockey National Championship is the biggest Roller Hockey Clubs Championship in Brazil.

Participated Teams in the last Season
The clubs that competed in 2015 were: Mogiana Hóquei Clube, Sport Clube de Recife, Clube Nautico Capibaribe, A Portuguesa de Desportos, Clube Portugues do Recife and Clube Internacional de Regatas.

List of Winners

Number of Championships by team

External links

Brazil websites
Confederação Brasileira de Hóquei e Patinação

Brazilian Teams Websites
Clube Internacional de Regatas

International
 Roller Hockey links worldwide
 Mundook-World Roller Hockey
Hardballhock-World Roller Hockey
Inforoller World Roller Hockey 
 World Roller Hockey Blog
rink-hockey-news - World Roller Hockey

Roller hockey competitions in Brazil
Brazil
Recurring sporting events established in 1972
Roller Hockey